MegaRace 3 is a racing/vehicular combat video game developed by Cryo Interactive in 2002, released for Windows and the PlayStation 2. MegaRace 3 is the third game in the MegaRace series, after MegaRace and MegaRace 2.

This game also features host, Lance Boyle, played by Christian Erickson. It renders the game graphics in full real-time 3D, unlike the previous two games.

Microïds, owners of the Cryo brand, made the game available on GOG.com on 2 June 2009.

Reception

References

External links 
  at Microïds (PC) (archived from the original) 
 

2002 video games
Cryo Interactive games
DreamCatcher Interactive games
Microïds games
Science fiction racing games
Windows games
PlayStation 2 games
Video games developed in France
Video games using Havok
RenderWare games